Pierre Chambiges, (died 19 June 1544), was a French master mason (maître des œuvres de maçonnerie et pavement de la Ville de Paris) and architect to François I of France and his son Henri II.

As surveyor and architect, Chambiges was involved in numerous royal and official projects:

The cathedral of Notre-Dame de Senlis
The Palais du Louvre
The Hôtel de ville of Paris; he oversaw the construction of the design by Domenico da Cortona (1533 onwards; demolished)
The Château de Saint-Germain-en-Laye and the Pavillon de la Muette in the park
The Château de Fontainebleau
The Château de Challeau, near Fontainebleau (modified, then demolished)

For Anne de Montmorency he designed and built the Château de Chantilly.

The son of mason Martin Chambiges (c.1465–1532), whose west front of the cathedral of Troyes, begun in 1507 occupied him for several decades, he died in Paris.

References

16th-century French architects
Renaissance architects
1544 deaths
Year of birth unknown
Architects from Paris